The Athletic Motivation Inventory was developed in 1969 by Thomas Tuko, Bruce Ogilvie, and Leland Lyon. It has just under 200 questions and measures the following scales:
Drive
Aggression
Determination
Responsibility
Leadership
Self-confidence
Emotional control
Mental toughness
Coachability
Conscience
Trust

There are doubts about its usefulness.

References 

Personality tests
Sports psychology